Octavia Broske (June 4, 1886 – March 19, 1967) was an American actress and musical performer.

Career 

Broske's stage career began in San Francisco. Her Broadway roles included parts in The Jersey Lily (1903), Tillie's Nightmare (1910–1911), A La Broadway (1911), Oh! Oh! Delphine! (1912–1913), Madame Moselle (1914), Papa's Darling (1914–1915), and A Lonely Romeo (1919). Away from Broadway, Broske was seen in The Sultan of Sulu (1905–1906), A Waltz Dream (1909), Her Left Shoulder (1912), and Get Off My Carpet (1918). She and her second husband toured as a vaudeville act titled "International Stars of Song."

In 1916, Broske made a recording for Victor. She appeared in two silent films, She Loves and Lies (1920, also marketed as The Marriage Swindle) with Norma Talmadge, and The Great Adventure (1921), with Lionel Barrymore.

Personal life 
Broske married twice. She divorced her first husband, George C. Burke, in 1913. She married her second husband, actor George Bancroft, in 1916. They had a daughter, Georgette (1917– 2002). In the 1930s, the legality of the Bancrofts' marriage was questioned in court, because it was unclear whether he had ever divorced his first wife, Edna Brothers Bancroft. Octavia Broske Bancroft was widowed in 1956, and died in 1967, aged 80 years, in Los Angeles.

References

External links 

 
 
 

1886 births
1967 deaths
American stage actresses
American film actresses
American silent film actresses
20th-century American actresses